State Road 157 in the U.S. State of Indiana is a north–south route in Clay, Greene and Owen counties that covers a distance of about .

Route description
The southern terminus of State Road 157 is at State Road 54 in Bloomfield.  It runs north to Worthington where it intersects with U.S. Route 231 and State Road 67 (which are concurrent here).  A few miles to the north, it intersects with State Road 48.  It then passes through the southwest corner of Owen County with no major intersections and continues into Clay county.  Its northern terminus is at State Road 59 and State Road 246 in Clay City.

Major intersections

References

External links

157
Transportation in Clay County, Indiana
Transportation in Greene County, Indiana
Transportation in Owen County, Indiana